Gilbert Simondon (2 October 1924 – 7 February 1989) was a French philosopher best known for his theory of individuation, a major source of inspiration for Gilles Deleuze, Bruno Latour and Bernard Stiegler.

Career 
Born in Saint-Étienne, Simondon was a student of philosopher of science Georges Canguilhem, philosopher Martial Guéroult, and phenomenologist Maurice Merleau-Ponty. He studied at the Ecole Normale Supérieure and the Sorbonne. He defended his doctoral dissertations in 1958 at the University of Paris. His main thesis, L'individuation à la lumière des notions de Forme et d'Information (Individuation in the light of the notions of Form and Information), was published in two parts, the first in 1964 under the title L'individu et sa génèse physico-biologique (Individuation and its physical-biological genesis) at the Presses Universitaires de France, while it is only in 1989 that Aubier published the second part, L'individuation psychique et collective (Psychic and collective individuation). While his main thesis, which laid the foundations of his thinking, was not widely read until it was commented upon by Gilles Deleuze and, more recently, Bruno Latour and Bernard Stiegler, his complementary thesis, Du mode d'existence des objets techniques (On the mode of existence of technical objects) was published by Aubier immediately after being completed (in 1958) and had an instant impact on a wide audience. It was only in 2005 that Jérôme Millon published a complete edition of the main thesis.

Individuation and technology 
In L'individuation psychique et collective, Simondon developed a theory of individual and collective individuation, in which the individual subject is considered as an effect of individuation, rather than as a cause. Thus the individual atom is replaced by the never-ending process of individuation. Simondon also conceived of "pre-individual fields" as the resources making individuation itself possible. Individuation is an always incomplete process, always leaving a "pre-individual" left-over, itself making possible future individuations. Furthermore, psychic individuation always creates both an individual and a collective subject, which individuate themselves together. Simondon criticized Norbert Wiener's theory of cybernetics, arguing that "Right from the start, Cybernetics has accepted what all theory of technology must refuse: a classification of technological objects conducted by means of established criteria and following genera and species." Simondon aimed to overcome the shortcomings of cybernetics by developing a "general phenomenology" of machines.

Influence 
Simondon's theory of individuation through transduction in a metastable environment was an important influence on the thought of Gilles Deleuze, whose Différence et répétition (1968), Logique du sens (1969) and L'île déserte (2002) make explicit reference to Simondon's work. Gilbert Simondon: une pensée de l'individuation et de la technique (1994), the proceedings of the first conference devoted to Simondon's work, further charts his influence on such thinkers as François Laruelle, Gilles Châtelet, Anne Fagot-Largeau, Yves Deforge, René Thom, and Bernard Stiegler (the latter having placed Simondon's theory of individuation at the very heart of his multi-volume philosophical project). Another contributor to Gilbert Simondon: une pensée de l'individuation et de la technique, Simondon's friend John Hart, was the instigator of the very first translation—from French into English c.1980—of Simondon's work (this at University of Western Ontario in Canada where Hart had founded both a Department of Computer Science and a Simondon-inspired network: the ATN, or Audio Tactile Network in 1964). Jean-Hugues Barthélémy edited the Cahiers Simondon from 2009 to 2015 with a total of six issues. Currently, Simondon can be seen as a major influence on the work of such scholars as Paolo Virno, Jean-Hugues Barthélémy, Thierry Bardini, Luciana Parisi, Brian Massumi, Adrian Mackenzie, Muriel Combes, Carl Mitcham, Andrew Feenberg, Yuk Hui, Isabelle Stengers, Thomas LaMarre, Bruno Latour and Anne Sauvagnargues.

Bibliography 
Du mode d'existence des objets techniques (Méot, 1958; second ed. Paris: Aubier, 1989).
L'individu et sa genèse physico-biologique (l'individuation à la lumière des notions de forme et d'information) (Paris: PUF, 1964; second ed. J.Millon, coll. Krisis, 1995).
L'individuation psychique et collective (Paris, Aubier, 1989; reprinted in 2007 with a preface by Bernard Stiegler).

Posthumous publications
L’Invention dans les techniques, Cours et conferences (Éd. du Seuil, coll. "Traces écrites").
L’Individuation à la lumière des notions de forme et d’information (Jérôme Millon, coll. Krisis, 2005).
Cours sur la perception (1964–1965), Préface de Renaud Barbaras (Editions de La Transparence).
Imagination et invention (1965–1966) (Editions de La Transparence, 2008).
Communication et Information. Cours et Conférences (Éditions de La Transparence, 2010).
Sur la technique (P.U.F., 2014).
Sur la psychologie (P.U.F., 2015).
Sur la philosophie (P.U.F., 2016).
La résolution des problèmes (P.U.F., 2018).

English translations
"Technical Mentality," trans. Arne De Boever, Parrhesia 07 (2009): 7-27  . 
"Techno Aesthetics," trans. Arne De Boever, Parrhesia 14 (2012): 1-8 . 
"Technical Individualization," in Joke Brouwer & Arjen Mulder (eds.), Interact or Die! (Rotterdam: NAi, 2007). 
"The Essence of Technicity," trans. Ninian Mellamphy, Dan Mellamphy & Nandita Biswas Mellamphy, Deleuze Studies 5 (11.11.2011): 406-424, [2].   
"The Genesis of the Individual," in Jonathan Crary & Sanford Kwinter (eds.), Incorporations (New York: Zone Books, 1992): 297–319.
"The Position of the Problem of Ontogenesis," trans. Gregory Flanders, Parrhesia 07 (2009): 4-16.  . 
 "The Limits of Human Progress," trans Sean Cubitt, Cultural Politics, 8(2) (2010): 229-36.Cultural Politics, 8(2) (2010): 229-36
Two Lessons on Animal and Man (Minneapolis: Univocal Publishing, 2012) .
On the Mode of Existence of Technical Objects (Minneapolis: Univocal Publishing, 2016) .
Individuation in Light of Notions of Form and Information (Minneapolis: University of Minnesota Press, 2020)
 Also see the Online translations section (below) for unpublished translations.

References

Further reading 
Alloa, Emmanuel, "Prégnances du devenir. Simondon et les images", in Critique 816 (2015): 356 - 371 .
Alloa, Emmanuel & Judith Michalet, "Differences in Becoming. Gilbert Simondon and Gilles Deleuze on Individuation" in Philosophy Today vol. 61 no. 3 (2017):  475-502.. 
Bardin, Andrea, "Philosophy as Political Technē: The Tradition of Invention in Simondon’s Political Thought" Contemporary Political Theory, 2018.
Bardin, Andrea, Epistemology and Political Philosophy in Gilbert Simondon. Individuation, Technics, Social Systems (Springer, 2015).
Barthélémy, Jean-Hugues, Life and Technology: An Inquiry Into and Beyond Simondon (tr. B. Norman, Meson Press, 2015).
Barthélémy, Jean-Hugues, Simondon (Paris: Les Belles Lettres, 2014).
Barthélémy, Jean-Hugues (dir.), Cahiers Simondon N° 1 to 6 (Paris: L'Harmattan, 2009-2015).
Barthélémy, Jean-Hugues, "Individuation and Knowledge. The refutation of idealism in Simondon's Heritage in France", translated by M. Hayward and A. De Boever, SubStance, Special Issue "Gilbert Simondon", Issue 129, Vol. 41, N°3, 2012.
Barthélémy, Jean-Hugues, "What new Humanism today ?", translated by Chris Turner, Cultural Politics, Vol. 6, Issue 2, Bergs Publishers, 2010.
Barthélémy, Jean-Hugues, "Du mort qui saisit le vif. Simondonian ontology today", trans. Justin Clemens, Parrhesia 7 (2009): 28-35 .
Barthélémy, Jean-Hugues, Simondon ou l'encyclopédisme génétique (Paris: Presses Universitaires de France, 2008)
Barthélémy, Jean-Hugues, Penser l'individuation. Simondon et la philosophie de la nature (Paris: L'Harmattan, 2005). .
Barthélémy, Jean-Hugues, Penser la connaissance et la technique après Simondon (Paris: L'Harmattan, 2005). .
Bidet, Alexandra, Macé, Marielle. "S'individuer, s'émanciper, risquer un style (autour de Simondon)", Revue du Mauss, n°38 - Emancipation, subjectivation, individuation. Psychanalyse, philosophie et science sociale, La Découverte, 2011, pp. 269–284.
Bontems, Vincent (dir.), Gilbert Simondon ou l'invention du futur (Paris: Klincksieck, 2016).
Caponi, Saverio, Gilbert Simondon. La tecnica e la vita, Lulu.com, 2010.
Carrozzini, Giovanni, Gilbert Simondon filosofo della mentalité technique, Mimesis, Milano 2011.
Carrozzini, Giovanni, Gilbert Simondon: per un'assiomatica dei saperi. Dall'"ontologia dell'individuo" alla filosofia della tecnologia, Manni, San Cesario di Lecce 2006
Chabot, Pascal, La philosophie de Simondon (Paris, Vrin, 2003). (English translation : "The philosophy of Simondon.Between technology and individuation", Bloomsbury, 2013)
Combes, Muriel, Gilbert Simondon and the Philosophy of the Transindividual, translated by Thomas LaMarre, MIT Press 2013 (originally published in French: Simondon, Individu et collectivité, Presses Universitaires de France 1999)
 Critique no. 816 (2015), Special Issue on Gilbert Simondon, with texts by Elie During, Emmanuel Alloa, Irlande Saurin, Anne Sauvegnargues and Gilbert Simondon 
Deleuze, Gilles, "On Gilbert Simondon," in Desert Islands and Other Texts, 1953–1974 (Los Angeles & New York: Semiotext(e), 2004): 86–9. 
De Boever, Murray, Roffe & Ashley (eds.), Gilbert Simondon: Being and Technology (Edinburgh University Press, hardback: 2012; paperback: March 2013).
Dumouchel, Paul, "Gilbert Simondon's Plea for a Philosophy of Technology," in The Politics of Knowledge (Bloomington & Indianapolis: Indiana University Press, 1995): 255-71. .
During, Elie, Simondon au pied du mur. .
Hottois, Gilbert, Simondon et la philosophie de la culture technique (Brussels: De Boeck, 1992). .
Mackenzie, Adrian, Transductions: Bodies and Machines at Speed (Continuum Press, 2002). 
Massumi, Brian, Technical Mentality" Revisited: Brian Massumi on Gilbert Simondon, Parrhesia 7 (2009): 36-45 .
Mills, Simon, Gilbert Simondon - Information, Technology and Media (Rowman and Littlefield, 2016).
Morizot, Baptiste, Pour une théorie de la rencontre. Hasard et individuation chez Gilbert Simondon (Paris: Vrin, 2016; foreword by Jean-Hugues Barthélémy).
Revue philosophique de la France et de l'étranger, Gilbert Simondon, n°3/2006.
Sabolius, Kristupas, "Traversing Life and Thought: Gilbert Simondon's Theory of Cyclic Imagination", in Social Imaginaries 5.2 (2019): 37-57.
Scott, David, Gilbert Simondon's Psychic and Collective Individuation (Edinburgh: Edinburgh University Press, 2014).
Stiegler, Bernard, Acting Out (Stanford: Stanford University Press, 2009).
Stiegler, Bernard, The Theater of Individuation: Phase-shift and Resolution in Simondon and Heidegger, trans.  Kristina Lebedeva, Parrhesia 7 (2009): 46-57.
Stiegler, Bernard, Technics and Time, 1: The Fault of Epimetheus (Stanford: Stanford University Press, 1998).
Stiegler, Bernard, Temps et individuation technique, psychique, et collective dans l’oeuvre de Simondon. .
 Tenti, Gregorio, Estetica e morfologia in Gilbert Simondon, Mimesis, 2020
Thibault, Ghislain, Filming Simondon: The National Film Board, Education, and Humanism , Canadian Journal of Film Studies, vol. 26 n°1/2017, pp. 1–23 
Thibault, Ghislain and Mark Hayward, Understanding Machines: A History of Canadian Mechanology , Canadian Journal of Communication, vol. 42 n°3/2017  
Toscano, Alberto, "Technical Culture and the Limits of Interaction: A Note on Simondon," in Joke Brouwer & Arjen Mulder (eds.), Interact or Die! (Rotterdam: NAi, 2007): 198-205.
Virno, Paolo, Angels and the General Intellect: Individuation in Duns Scotus and Gilbert Simondon, Parrhesia 7 (2009): 58-67 .

Films
François Lagarde and Pascal Chabot have made a movie on Simondon: Simondon of the Desert (english translation) with Anne Fagot-Largeault, Arne De Boever, Dominique Lecourt, Gilbert Hottois, Giovanni Carrozzini, Jean-Hugues Barthélémy, Jean Clottes, and music by Jean-Luc Guillonet.

External links 

Online translations
Save the Technical Object, link to PDF file of unpublished 2013 translation.
MEOT / METO, link to PDF file of unpublished 2010 translation.
 Also see the English translations section (above) for published translations.

Other links
The Gilbert Simondon issue of Parrhesia 
Filmed interview of Gilbert Simondon on the subject of mechanology, 1968 .
On Gilbert Simondon's Unified Theory of Technics and Technology, by François Laruelle
Autour de Simondon: List of articles about Simondon, by the revue online Appareil .
Aud-Sissel-Hoel and Van-der-Tuin on Simondon's link to Ernst Cassirer
Gilbert Simondon Biography by Nathalie Simondon
"Simondon au pied du mur" by Elie During . 
Mode of Existence, English translation. 
On the Essence of Technicity.
Simondon biography 
List of articles about Simondon .
Online Issue on Simondon, by Jean-Hugues Barthélémy (dir.)). 
"Simondon Week" on TheFunambulist.net. 
"Penser l'école avec Gilbert Simondon"  .
CIDES (Centre International des Études Simondoniennes) a.k.a. ICSS (International Center for Simondon Studies)
Conference-video on Gilbert Simondon and the New Enlightenment .
Simondon at Monoskop.org, with extensive bibliography.
A short list of Gilbert Simondon's vocabulary
A research project (and book in preparation) on the relationship between Gilbert Simondon, mechanology and Canadian intellectuals

1924 births
1989 deaths
Writers from Saint-Étienne
École Normale Supérieure alumni
University of Paris alumni
20th-century French philosophers
Historians of technology
Metaphysicians
Philosophers of technology
Social philosophers
Epistemologists
Continental philosophers
20th-century French historians
20th-century French male writers